Langi may refer to:
Ləngi, Azerbaijan
Langi people, a people of Uganda
 Langi (burial), Tongan burial structures for kings